The Pocket Dream Console is a small handheld game console created by Conny in 2004. The system was released in Japan in 2006 by Takara Tomy.
It is available in different colors.

In Germany, the PDC is rebranded as "MGT (Mobile Games Technology) Pocket Star LCD - Spielkonsole 30in1" by importer PEARL or sold under the original Name "PDC" from Videojet at Toys R Us. The Videojet-Version is available with 30, 40, 50 or 100 games. A 200 games model was also sold.

System overview

Games 
The PDC is a closed system with 100 built-in games, mostly unofficial clones of other popular titles, including clones of Loderunner, Arkanoid, Puzzloop, Sokoban, Bomberman and Nintendogs.
The advertised line-up includes:
 6 action games
 4 racing games
 6 entertainment
 3 casino
 5 puzzle games
 6 table

CPU 
Sunplus 16-bit SPG 240 Series chipset

I/O 
 A/V port: The system can be connected to a TV or other equipment with a custom cable for composite video and mono audio and is sold separately. It uses a mini USB B connector.
 Mini headphone jack (2.5 mm).
 Buttons: D-pad; A, B and menu buttons; two shoulder pads and volume control.
 2" backlit TFT LCD screen.

Power 
 3 AAA batteries.

Display 
 Manufacturer: AU Optronics
 Size: 2 inch
 Full color
 Resolution: 320x240
 Pixel positioning: delta
 Number of contacts: 33
 Backlight
 color: blue, red and white

Audio 
 One built-in speaker

See also 
 Mi2 console

References

External links 
 Impress Japan about the PDC
 TakaraTomy's PDC product page
 NCS play test
 Review at Game Set Watch
 Spanish Impress about PDC

Handheld game consoles
Takara Tomy
Products introduced in 2006
Sunplus-based video game consoles